Ugryumov or Ugryumova (feminine) is Russian surnames. It is the last name of the following people:
German Ugryumov, Soviet and Russian navy and security services official
Grigory Ugryumov, Russian painter
Pyotr Ugryumov, former professional road racing cyclist from Latvia
Viktor Ugryumov, former Soviet equestrian and Olympic champion

Russian-language surnames